Mark Ingty (born 16 September 1976) is an Indian cricketer. He has played List A cricket since 2000 and first-class cricket since 2001. In September 2018, he was named in Meghalaya's squad for the 2018–19 Vijay Hazare Trophy. He made his Twenty20 debut on 9 November 2019, for Meghalaya in the 2019–20 Syed Mushtaq Ali Trophy.

References

External links
 

1976 births
Living people
Indian cricketers
Assam cricketers
Meghalaya cricketers
Place of birth missing (living people)